The 1060s was a decade of the Julian Calendar which began on January 1, 1060, and ended on December 31, 1069.

Significant people
 William the Conqueror
 Harold Godwinson
 Harald Hardrada
 Edward the Confessor
 Edgar the Ætheling
 Tostig Godwinson
 Al-Qa'im
 Tughril
 Alp Arslan

References